WTUP-FM (99.3 MHz) is a radio station licensed to serve Guntown, Mississippi, USA, which serves Tupelo and northeast Mississippi with an ERP of 15,500 watts. WTUP-FM is owned by iHeartMedia. The station is the former WBIP-FM.

References

External links

TUP-FM
IHeartMedia radio stations